{{Infobox play
| name              = The Younger Brother
| image             =File:The Lost Lover, by Mary Delarivier Manley, title page.jpg
| image_size        =
| caption           = Title page of The Lost Lover.
| writer            = Delarivier Manley
| setting           = 
| date of premiere  = March 1696
| original language = English
| place             = Theatre Royal, Drury Lane, London
| series            = 
| subject           = 
| genre             = Comedy
}}The Lost Lover; or The Jealous Husband: A Comedy, Delarivier Manley's first published play, was performed in March 1696 at Theatre Royal, Drury Lane. The performance ran only three nights.

The original cast included Benjamin Johnson, John Verbruggen, Hildebrand Horden, George Powell, Colley Cibber, William Pinkethman, Joseph Haines, Mary Kent, Jane Rogers, Frances Maria Knight, Susanna Verbruggen and Margaret Mills.

Characters
As listed in the original script:
Men
Sir Rustic Good-Heart, an ill-bred country gentleman
Wilmore, Rustic's son
Wildman, Rustic's friend
Sir Amorous Courtall 
Smyrna, a Turkey Merchant 
Pulse, a Physician 
Knowlittle, a Fortune-teller
Timothy, his Man
Ready, servant to Wildman

Women
Lady Young-Love, an Old, vain, conceited Lady
Marina, her daughter
Belira, secret mistress to Wilmore 
Orinda, an affected poetess 
Olivia, Smyrna's Wife
Isabella, woman to Lady Young-Love 
Phoebe, Olivia's maid 
Page 
Servants

References

Bibliography
 Van Lennep, W. The London Stage, 1660-1800: Volume One, 1660-1700. Southern Illinois University Press, 1960 .

External Works
Full text of The Lost Lover'' available at Emory Women Writers Resource Project
 The London Stage Part I

Restoration comedy
1696 plays
West End plays
Plays by Delarivier Manley